Empire State is a 1987 British film about gang warfare over American investment in the East End of London, directed by Ron Peck.

Synopsis
In the late eighties,  investment and redevelopment of  the East End of London is well underway. Empire State, a sumptuous nightclub attracts  crowds. However, under the control of gangland boss Frank Wright (Ray McAnally) it's also a cover for gangland violence and drug dealing. As new investment capital flows into the city,  a gangland turf war is underway,  with the area's older generation of gangsters, led by Frank, being challenged by ambitious upstarts like Paul (Ian Sears). When an American called Chuck (Martin Landau) arrives in the city intending to invest a substantial amount of capital in the Docklands redevelopment, everyone becomes interested. Caught in the midst of this turmoil are receptionists Marion and Tricia, out for a night on the town; call girl Susan and her increasingly insane lover Danny , drifter Pete, rent boy Johnny; and boxers intent on proving themselves in illegal bare-fist combat at the club. Journalist Richard delves into the internal workings of the club, trying to find out details about Empire State and the criminal activity that occurs there. After the climactic bare-knuckle boxing competition, Danny finds Marion at the night club with her night's companion and opens fire on the club's entrance.

Cast
 Cathryn Harrison – Marion
 Jason Hoganson – Pete 
 Glen Murphy – Vincenzo
 Jamie Foreman – Danny
 Emily Bolton – Susan
 Ian Sears – Paul
 Martin Landau – Chuck
 Lorcan Cranitch – Richard
 Ray McAnally – Frank
 Lee Drysdale – Johnny
 Jenny Bolt – Tricia
 Jimmy Flint – Billy
 John Levitt – Harry
 Ian McCurrach – 'Metropolis' editor
 Elizabeth Hickling – Cheryl
• Perry Fenwick - Darren

Response
The film was criticised at the time for its uneven pacing, rudimentary characterisation and acting skills of many of its cast. However, after the redevelopment of the Docklands area in the late eighties and early nineties, which had only begun when Empire State was filmed, architectural students have noted the contrast between the transitional status of derelict buildings and the imminent arrival of capital in the area to construct new apartments and corporate premises.

References

External links
 
 

1987 films
British crime thriller films
1980s British films